The Russian Bandy Federation (Russian: Федерация хоккея с мячом России, ФХМР (FKhMR)), formerly All-Russian Bandy Federation (Всероссийская федерация хоккея с мячом) is the governing body for bandy in the Russian Federation. It was founded in 1992 when it replaced the old Soviet federation (Federation of bandy and field hockey USSR) as a member of the Federation of International Bandy (FIB).

History 

The Soviet Union was dissolved in December 1991, in the middle of the bandy season. This led the Soviet national teams to initially be rebranded as CIS in January and February 1992. A new Russian national team was also set up and at the Russian Government Cup 1992 both teams played. 

The Federation banned coach Igor Gapanovich of Vodnik Arkhangelsk and coach Evgeny Erakhtin of Baykal-Energiya each for 30 months in March 2017, and fined each club 300,000 rubles (£4,100/$5,100/€4,800) for the teams scoring an aggregate of 20 goals in their own nets rather than their opponent’s to ensure they played against a convenient team in upcoming play-offs.

Structure 

The Russian Bandy Federation is headquartered in Moscow. President since 2009 is Boris Skrynnik, who is also the president of FIB since 2005. The federation has four vice presidents, one of whom is former pro-boxer Nikolai Valuev, who is also the general manager of the Russia national bandy team; another vice president is Sergey Myaus, head coach of the national bandy team.

The federation is governing the national leagues in Russia, which is set up in a top-tier Russian Bandy Super League and second tier leagues, as well as the Russian Cup. The Russian Bandy Super League is fully professional and the winning team each year is crowned Russian champions.

Presidents 
 1992-2009 Albert Pomortsev
 2009- Boris Skrynnik

See also 
 Russia women's national bandy team

References

External links
  

Bandy in Russia
Federation of International Bandy members
Bandy governing bodies
Bandy
Sports organizations established in 1992
1992 establishments in Russia